The Pattagansett River is a river located in the town of East Lyme, Connecticut, near the village of Niantic. Fishing for bass is a popular activity.

References 

Rivers of New London County, Connecticut